Aidan Robert Nesbitt (born 5 February 1997) is a Scottish professional footballer who plays as a midfielder for Falkirk.

He has previously played for Partick Thistle, Dundee United, Milton Keynes Dons and Greenock Morton, after progressing through the Celtic youth academy.

Club career

Celtic
Nesbitt is a product of the academy system at Celtic. On 21 May 2015, Nesbitt scored a hat-trick in the Scottish Youth Cup final against Rangers. On 23 September 2015, Nesbitt made his first team debut in a League Cup match against Raith Rovers when he came on in the 89th minute. On 24 April 2016, he won the Celtic academy player of the year award.

On 1 February 2016, Nesbitt joined fellow Scottish Premiership side Partick Thistle on loan until the end of the 2015–16 season. Nesbitt made his Premiership debut for Partick Thistle, starting in a 2–0 home win against St Johnstone on 23 February 2016; getting awarded a man of the match for his performance. He signed on loan with Greenock Morton in August 2016. The loan was extended in January 2017 until the end of the season.

Milton Keynes Dons
On 31 August 2017, Nesbitt joined League One club Milton Keynes Dons for an undisclosed fee, signing a two-year deal. Having made intermittent appearances under manager Robbie Neilson, Nesbitt soon found himself out of favour under new manager Paul Tisdale during the 2018–19 season. Nesbitt left the club by mutual consent on 2 January 2019, having made a total of 27 appearances in all competitions and scoring 4 goals.

Dundee United
On 4 January 2019, Nesbitt joined Scottish Championship club Dundee United on a short term deal, reuniting with his former manager at his previous club, Robbie Neilson. Nesbitt was released by United on 6 May 2019.

Greenock Morton
On 17 June 2019, Nesbitt signed for Greenock Morton on a one-year contract.

International career
Nesbitt was named in the team of the tournament at the 2014 UEFA European Under-17 Football Championship, as Scotland U17s reached the semi-finals. He then appeared for the Scotland U19 team in each of the following two seasons. Whilst on loan to Morton, Nesbitt received his first call-up to the Scotland U21 squad in September 2016.

He was selected for the under-20 squad in the 2017 Toulon Tournament.  After a historic first ever win against Brazil, which was at any level. Nesbitt played in the win over Czech Republic for the bronze medal. It was the nations first ever medal at the competition.

Career statistics

Honours
Celtic U20
Scottish Youth Cup: 2014–15

Scotland U20
Toulon Tournament: Bronze 2017

Individual
UEFA European Under-17 Championship Team of the Tournament: 2014

References

External links

1997 births
Living people
Footballers from Paisley, Renfrewshire
Scottish footballers
Scotland youth international footballers
Scotland under-21 international footballers
Association football midfielders
Dundee United F.C. players
Milton Keynes Dons F.C. players
Celtic F.C. players
Partick Thistle F.C. players
Greenock Morton F.C. players
Scottish Professional Football League players
English Football League players
Falkirk F.C. players